The Northern Ireland Grand Committee is one of four such grand committees in the United Kingdom Parliament. The other three are for Scotland, Wales and, as of October 2015, England. The membership of the committee includes all participating Northern Irish MPs, as well as up to 25 other MPs who are nominated by the Committee of Selection.

The purpose of the committee is to read bills that are relevant to Northern Ireland before their second or third readings in Parliament. It also provides an opportunity for MPs to question ministers, debate current matters and for ministers to make statements. There are between three and six committee meetings per year.

Until recently, unlike its Scottish and Welsh counterparts, the Northern Ireland Grand Committee met at Westminster and never in Northern Ireland.  However, the Democratic Unionist Party pressed for a meeting to take place in Northern Ireland itself. The government agreed, and in December 2006 the first local meeting of the committee took place in the council chamber at Belfast City Hall. The committee met again in Northern Ireland in September 2013, this time in the Senate Chamber at Parliament Buildings, Stormont.

See also
List of Committees of the United Kingdom Parliament
Northern Ireland Affairs Select Committee
Scottish Grand Committee
Welsh Grand Committee

References

External links
Northern Ireland Grand Committee Debates
Northern Ireland Grand Committee Debates by parliamentary year:
2006-2007
2005-2006
2004-2005
2003-2004
2002-2003
2001-2002
2000-2001
1999-2000
1998-1999
1997-1998

Committees of the British House of Commons